Dorida is a municipality in the Phocis regional unit, Central Greece, Greece. The seat of the municipality is the town Lidoriki. The municipality has an area of 998.893 km2.

Municipality
The municipality Dorida was formed at the 2011 local government reform by the merger of the following 4 former municipalities, that became municipal units:
Efpalio
Lidoriki
Tolofon
Vardousia

Province
The province of Dorida was one of the provinces of Phocis. It had the same territory as the present municipality. It was abolished in 2006.

References

Municipalities of Central Greece
Provinces of Greece
Populated places in Phocis